The following lists events that happened during 1842 in Chile.

Incumbents
President of Chile: Manuel Bulnes

Events

Births
14 April - Pedro Lucio Cuadra (died 1894)
10 July - Manuel Bulnes Pinto (died 1899)
14 October - Recaredo Santos Tornero (died 1902)

Deaths
date unknown - Juan Godoy (born 1800)
4 February - Paul Delano (born 1775)
 24 October-Bernardo O'Higgins (born 1778)

References 

 
1840s in Chile
Chile
Chile